Come Home to Mama is the third studio album by singer-songwriter Martha Wainwright, released on October 15, 2012. The album was recorded at Sean Lennon's home studio in New York City and produced by Yuka Honda. Guest musicians include Honda, Lennon, Wilco guitarist Nels Cline and Dirty Three drummer Jim White. "Proserpina", the album's first single, was written by Wainwright's deceased mother, Kate McGarrigle.

Composition
Come Home to Mama was recorded at Sean Lennon's home studio in New York City and produced by Yuka Honda. Guest musicians include Honda, Lennon, Wilco guitarist Nels Cline and Dirty Three drummer Jim White.

The song "Four Black Sheep" was originally recorded in 2009 for CBC Radio 2's Great Canadian Song Quest.

Track listing

Charts

References

2012 albums
Martha Wainwright albums
V2 Records albums